Publius Valerius Laevinus was commander of the Roman forces at the Battle of Heraclea in 280 BC, in which he was defeated by Pyrrhus of Epirus. In his Life of Pyrrhus, Plutarch wrote that Gaius Fabricius Luscinus said of this battle that it was not the Epirots who had beaten the Romans, but only Pyrrhus who had beaten Laevinus. 

Laevinus was consul, along with Tiberius Coruncanius, in 280 BC.

See also
 Valeria (gens)
 Pyrrhic War

Sources
The Life of Pyrrhus by Plutarch 

Roman patricians
3rd-century BC Roman consuls
Laevinus, Publius
Ancient Roman generals
Pyrrhic War